P. ursinus may refer to:
 Papio ursinus, a baboon species
 Paruromys ursinus, a rat species

See also
 Ursinus (disambiguation)